The Wynona Riders are an East Bay pop punk band formed in 1988 as Miss Conduct by Jim Tyler (drums), Eric Matson (guitar), Ron Murphy (bass) and Mike Lipari (vocals). In 1989 Ron Greer (Skip) joined the band as the lead singer, changing their name upon their first 924 Gilman Street performance. It was named after the actress Winona Ryder.

Personnel changes
Jim Tyler did not get along with his bandmates very well due to his renewed Christian values, so he left the band in 1990 for college.  Jim went on to play drums for Flaccid and HOSS, based in Fort Collins, Co.   Ron Murphy originally took over drumming duties, but continuing creative differences led to his split from the band. Bass playing then went to  Jack Cheeze (Paul Naginis), while Rico Martinez filled in on drums. In this line-up they recorded the track "Break" for a compilation album called "Can of Pork" (LKOUT 44). Subsequently, Rico was thrown in jail and replaced by Dave "E.C." Henwood of Filth and The Vagrants.

Jack Cheeze left the band over creative differences. Replaced by Richie Bucher, they recorded an EP called "Send in the clowns". In 1992, a tour across the U.S. was planned, when Erick suddenly quit the band without an explanation. Skip and Richie started the band "Here Kitty Kitty" with Joe Selby and Kreig White, and recorded some demos. As "Here Kitty Kitty" they did a tour across the U.S. in 1994.

Meanwhile, Skip asked their record company, Lookout! Records, if they would be interested to release the Wynona Riders demos on CD, as he did not want the music of that band to fade into history. When he asked Dave for his opinion on the release of these demos, he suggested that re-recording the tracks might be a better idea.

Skip, Dave and Richie got together, auditioned for a new guitar player, but eventually wound up working with Erick again. The recording sessions resulted in the album J.D. Salinger, containing a cover of Kim Wilde's Kids in America.

After the release of this album, Erick joined the band "Jack Killed Jill" and announced that he could not tour with The Wynona Riders. Upon hearing this, the other three members kicked him out of the band for good. After auditioning Patrick Hynes (one of the three owners of Lookout! Records at the time) and Joe Selby the band chose Joe to fill the guitar role for their 1995 US tour in support of the "J.D. Salinger" LP/CD.

After a successful tour that saw The Wynona Riders play over 40 shows around the country in six weeks the band decided to try to stick it out with the touring line-up and began writing new material for a follow-up record.  An interim release under the name The Nation of Wenonah was released on What Else? records out of Indiana as a split EP with band Lynard's Innards.  The EP was a send-up/tribute of the Washington D.C. band the Nation of Ulysses.  As more new songs were written the style of the band was veering towards the agitpop styles of other D.C. bands from the early 1990s and Richie and Dave found themselves less than enthusiastic about the direction the band was headed.

Time was booked into Andy Ernst's Art of Ears studio, where "J.D. Salinger" had been recorded to record an EP, Artificial Intelligence(LKOUT 162) for Lookout!, but before the band entered the studio they broke up after performing onstage at 924 Gilman St. in Berkeley, ironically while  opening for  Fifteen's farewell show.

Skip and Joe formed the band "Toyboat" with former Red #9 and Hi-Fives drummer Julie Rose and bassist Adam Turk, E.C. joined the band "Three Years Down", and Richie went to work at a bakery.  A year later Toyboat would disband and Joe Selby would join Three Years Down as their bass player with Skip moving to New York to pursue a career in information technology.

Current members
Ron "Skip" Greer: Vocals
Joe Selby: Guitar
Richie Bucher: Bass
Dave Henwood: Drums

Past members
Eric Matson: Guitar
Ron Murphy: Bass, Drums
Paul Naginis: Bass
Rico Martinez: Drums
Jim Tyler: Drums
Mike Lipari: Vocals

Discography

Studio albums

Compilation albums

Extended plays

Split EPs

Compilation appearances

References

Musical groups established in 1988
Musical groups from the San Francisco Bay Area
Pop punk groups from California